This is a list of nicknames of regiments of the British Army. Many nicknames were used by successor regiments (following renaming or amalgamation).

0
The 0.7 Hussars - 14th/20th King's Hussars (humourous simplification of regimental title)

1
1st Invalids – 41st (Welsh) Regiment of Foot later The Welsh Regiment (first raised as the Regiment of Invalids, in 1688)

A
Agile and Bolton Wanderers – Argyll and Sutherland Highlanders (humorous allusion to Bolton Wanderers F.C.)
The Aiglers – 87th Foot (captured a French Imperial Eagle (aigle) at the Battle of Barrosa)
The Albert Lesters – Prince Albert's Own Leicestershire Yeomanry, also known as "God's Own" in the 3rd Cavalry Division during the Great War (reference to the lack of KIA until 13 May 1915 – having landed in France since early November 1914).
Ally Sloper's Cavalry – Army Service Corps (humorous back-acronym; Ally Sloper was a popular pre-WWI cartoon character drawn by W.F. Thomas in a weekly comic strip; in contemporary slang an 'Alley Sloper' was a rent-dodger, who 'sloped off down the alley' when the rent-collector called)
Andy Capp's Commandos - Army Catering Corps, named after the famous newspaper cartoon character Andy Capp
The Angle-irons – Royal Anglian Regiment (humorous malapropism)
The Armoured Chavalry – Royal Tank Regiment
The Armoured Farmers – 3rd Royal Tank Regiment (raised in the West Country)
 The Assaye Regiment – 74th (Highland) Regiment of Foot (awarded a special Regimental Colour for service at the Battle of Assaye)

B
The Back Numbers (also The Back Badgers) – Gloucestershire Regiment (allowed to wear a regimental badge on the back of the hat, after the rear rank faced about to drive off French cavalry at the Battle of Alexandria (1801))
The Back Flash – Royal Welch Fusiliers (the last regiment to give up the queue or pigtail, retained the ribbons on the back of the collar)
Bakers Light Bobs – 10th Royal Hussars (Prince of Wales's Own)
 The Balsall Heath Artillery – 3rd South Midland Brigade, Royal Field Artillery (from their headquarters at Stoney Lane, Balsall Heath)
The Bangalore Gallopers – 13th Hussars
The Bangers – 1st Life Guards
Barrell's Blues – 4th Foot
The Bays – 2nd Dragoon Guards (Queen's Bays) 
The Beavers – 100th (Prince of Wales's Royal Canadian) Regiment of Foot later 1st Battalion Leinster Regiment (refers to the regiment's origin in Canada, and its first regimental badge)
The Belfast Regiment – 35th Foot
The Bendovers – 96th Regiment of Foot later 2nd Battalion Manchester Regiment
The Bengal Tigers 
 – Leicestershire Regiment (In 1825 the regiment was granted the badge of a "royal tiger" to recall their long service in India)
 – 24th Foot
The Bermuda Exiles – Grenadier Guards
The Bill Browns - Grenadier Guards
Bingham's Dandies – 17th Lancers (The commanding officer, Lord Bingham (later Earl of Lucan) spent a fortune on fine uniforms and horses for the regiment)
The Biscuit Boys – 49th (Princess Charlotte of Wales's) (Hertfordshire) Regiment of Foot later 1st Battalion Royal Berkshire Regiment
The Bird Catchers
 – 1st (Royal) Dragoons and Royal Scots Greys (both regiments captured French Imperial Eagle standards at the Battle of Waterloo)
 – 87th Foot (captured a French Imperial Eagle at the Battle of Barrosa)
The Black Cuffs – Northamptonshire Regiment
The Black Dragoons – 6th (Inniskilling) Dragoons
The Black Horse – 7th (The Princess Royal's) Dragoon Guards
The Black Knots – North Staffordshire Regiment (the regimental badge was a Stafford knot)
The Black Mafia – Royal Green Jackets (from the dark uniforms of the original Rifle regiments and the number of former Greenjacket officers promoted to high rank)
Blayney's Bloodhounds – 89th (The Princess Victoria's) Regiment of Foot (from their 'unerring certainty and untiring perseverance in hunting down the Irish rebels in 1798, when the corps was commanded by Lord Blayney')
The Bleeders – Somerset Light Infantry
The Blind Half Hundred – 50th (Queen's Own) Regiment of Foot later Royal West Kent Regiment (suffered badly from ophthalmia during the Egyptian Campaign of 1801.) 
The Bloodless Lambs – 16th Foot
The Bloodsuckers – 63rd (West Suffolk) Regiment of Foot later 1st Battalion Manchester Regiment (Supposedly derived from a regimental emblem worn by officers, the Fleur de Lis, 'which resembled that insect' - (Most commonly said to be a mosquito, associated with the Regiment's frequent service in the Caribbean and America).) 
The Bloody Eleventh – 11th (The North Devonshire) Regiment of Foot, later The Devonshire Regiment (from the heavy casualties suffered at the Battle of Salamanca)
The Blue Caps – The Royal Dublin Fusiliers (Originally the 1st Madras Fusiliers, part of the British East India Company's Madras Presidency Army, who wore light blue covers to their forage caps on campaign during the Indian Mutiny and were known as 'Neill's Blue Caps,' after their commanding officer).
The Blues – Royal Horse Guards (only British heavy cavalry regiment to wear blue rather than red uniforms)
The Blue Horse – 4th Dragoon Guards
The Blue Mafia – Queen's Own Highlanders
Bobs' Own – Irish Guards (refers to Field Marshal Lord Roberts, 'Bobs', the first Colonel of the regiment)
The Bomb-proofs – 14th Foot
The Botherers – King's Own Scottish Borderers (humorous malapropism)
The Bounders – 19th Foot
The Brass Heads – 109th Foot
The Brave Boys of Berks – Berkshire Regiment
The Brickdusts – 53rd (Shropshire) Regiment of Foot later 1st Battalion Shropshire Light Infantry
The Brothers – King's Own Scottish Borderers
Brown's Corps – 1st Lancashire Artillery Volunteers, raised by Sir William Brown, Baronet, and largely officered by his relatives
The Brummagen Guards – 29th (Worcestershire) Regiment of Foot (Largely recruited from the Birmingham area)
The Bubbly Jocks – Royal Scots Greys
Buckmaster's Light Infantry – West India Regiments
The Budgies – the Royal Regiment of Fusiliers (from the hackle worn in the beret)
The Butchers – 37th Foot
The Buttermilks – 4th Royal Irish Dragoon Guards

C
Calvert's Entire – West Yorkshire Regiment 
The Cameronians – 1st Battalion The Cameronians (Scottish Rifles)
The Carbs – Carabiniers (6th Dragoon Guards)
Lord Cardigan's Bloodhounds – 11th Hussars
The Cast Iron Sixth – 6th Battalion, London Regiment (City of London Rifles)
Castor Oil Dragoons – Royal Army Medical Corps
The Cat and Cabbage – The Royal Hampshire Regiment (from the regimental badge, which was a royal lion atop a stylised Tudor Rose)
The Cattle Reivers – Border Regiment
The Cauliflowers 47th (Lancashire) Regiment of Foot later 1st Battalion The Loyal North Lancashire Regiment (from the regimental badge, which was a stylised Red Rose of Lancaster)
The Celestials - 97th (The Earl of Ulster's) Regiment of Foot later 2nd Battalion Royal West Kent Regiment
The Centipedes - 100th (Prince of Wales's Royal Canadian) Regiment of Foot later 1st Battalion Leinster Regiment
The Chainy 10th - 10th Royal Hussars (Prince of Wales's Own)
Cheeses - 1st Life Guards and 2nd Life Guards
The Cheesemongers - Household Cavalry
The Cherry Pickers - 11th Hussars (Prince Albert's Own) (from an incident during the Peninsular War, in which the 11th Light Dragoons (as the regiment was then named) were attacked while raiding an orchard at San Martin de Trebejo in Spain)
The Cherubims - 11th Hussars (Prince Albert's Own) (originally the "Cherrybums", from the crimson overall trousers adopted when Prince Albert of Saxe-Coburg-Gotha became the Honorary Colonel in Chief)
Cia ma Tha's – 79th Highlanders (Scottish Gaelic for 'What's Wrong?')
The Cloudpunchers - Air Defence regiments of the Royal Artillery
The Coal Heavers - Grenadier Guards
The Cockney Jocks – London Scottish
The Coldstreamers - Coldstream Guards
The Colonials - 100th (Prince of Wales's Royal Canadian) Regiment of Foot later 1st Battalion Leinster Regiment
The Comical Chemical Corporals – Special Brigade, Royal Engineers (responsible for poison gas and flame attacks; men with knowledge of chemistry were immediately promoted to corporal)
The Commos – Royal Army Service Corps (possibly from their origins in the Commissariat and Transport Staff)
The Crossbelts – 8th Hussars
The Crusaders - 100th (Prince of Wales's Royal Canadian) Regiment of Foot later 1st Battalion Leinster Regiment
The Corned Beef Highlanders - The Cameron Highlanders, used as a reference to the Regimental tartan

D
The Daily Advertisers – 5th Lancers
The Dandies - 1st Battalion Grenadier Guards
The Dandy Ninth – 9th (Highlanders) Battalion Royal Scots
The Death or Glory Boys - 17th Lancers (Duke of Cambridge's Own) later 17th/21st Lancers, then Queen's Royal Lancers (from the regimental badge, which was a death's head (skull), with a scroll bearing the motto "or Glory")
The Delhi Spearman – 9th Lancers
The Desert Rats - 7th Armoured Division (United Kingdom) then 7th Armoured Brigade (United Kingdom), now 7th Infantry Brigade
The Devil's Own – 88th Regiment of Foot (Connaught Rangers) later 1st Battalion The Connaught Rangers
The Devil's Own – Inns of Court Regiment (so named by King George III )
The Devils Royals – 50th (Queen's Own) Regiment of Foot later 1st Battalion Royal West Kent Regiment
The Diehards – 57th (West Middlesex) Regiment of Foot later 1st Battalion Middlesex Regiment (from the Battle of Albuera during the Peninsular War, when Colonel William Inglis is said to have urged the decimated regiment to "die hard")
The Dirty Eighth – 8th Hussars
The Dirty Half Hundred – 50th (Queen's Own) Regiment of Foot later 1st Battalion Royal West Kent Regiment
The Dirty Shirts – 101st Regiment of Foot (Royal Bengal Fusiliers) later 1st Battalion Royal Munster Fusiliers ( During the Indian Mutiny the regiment wore shirts stained an early form of khaki as campaign dress)
The Doc's – Duke of Cornwall's Light Infantry – (from their initials DOCLI)
The Dogs – 17th Lancers
Dog Squadron - 1 Armoured Engineers Squadron
The Donkey Whallopers – Cavalry
The Don't-Dance Tenth – 10th Hussars
The Double X – Lancashire Fusiliers (from the regimental badge which, as the 20th Regiment of Foot, carried "XX", twenty in Roman numerals)
Douglas's Ecossais – Royal Scots (originally the Régiment de Douglas in French service)
The Drogheda Light Horse – 18th Royal Hussars (Queen Mary's Own)
The Drop-short Rifles – Royal Regiment of Artillery
The Dubsters – a composite of 1st Royal Dublin Fusiliers and 1st Royal Munster Fusiliers (formed between 30 April and 19 May 1915 after both battalions suffered heavy casualties)
The Duke's (or The Duke's Own) – 1st Royal Lancashire Militia (The Duke of Lancaster's Own) (especially after they were linked to the King's Own)
The Duke of Boots – Duke of Wellington's Regiment
The Duke's Canaries – Edinburgh (County and City) Militia (commanded by Henry Scott, 3rd Duke of Buccleuch, from their yellow facings)
The Dumpies – 19th Royal Hussars (Queen Alexandra's Own), 20th Hussars and 21st Lancers (originally raised for the army of the British East India Company, from undersized riders who would not overload the lighter, locally-procured horses.)

E
The Eagle-Takers – 87th Foot (captured a French Imperial Eagle at the Battle of Barrosa)
The Earl of Mar's Grey Breeks – Royal Scots Fusiliers (from their first colonel, Charles Erskine, Earl of Mar, and the grey breeches of their uniform)
The Edinburgh Regiment – 46th Foot
The Elegant Extracts – 7th Regiment of Foot later Royal Fusiliers and 85th Regiment of Foot (Bucks Volunteers) later 2nd Battalion Shropshire Light Infantry (in 1811, many of the regiment's officers were court-martialled and replaced by officers drawn from other regiments.)
Eliott's Light Horse – 15th The King's Hussars
The Emperor's Chambermaids – 14th King's Hussars (from an incident during the Battle of Vitoria during the Peninsular War, when the regiment captured a silver chamberpot belonging to Joseph Bonaparte, brother of the Emperor Napoleon Bonaparte)
England's Northern Cavalry – The Light Dragoons
The English Jocks – 2nd Battalion, Gloucestershire Regiment (in 1914–16 they were the only English Battalion in 81st Brigade, which otherwise consisted of up to five Scottish battalions)
The Evergreens – 13th Hussars
The Ever-Sworded – 29th (Worcestershire) Regiment of Foot later Worcestershire Regiment
The Excellers – 40th (2nd Somersetshire) Regiment of Foot later South Lancashire Regiment (from the regimental badge; 40 in Roman numerals is "XL")

F
The Faithful Durhams – Durham Light Infantry (from their motto, 'Faithful')
 Faugh-a-Ballagh Boys, or The Faughs – 87th (Royal Irish Fusiliers) Regiment of Foot later 1st Battalion Royal Irish Fusiliers (from their Gaelic war cry 'Faugh a Ballagh' ('Clear the Way') during the Peninsular War).
The Featherbeds – 16th Foot
The Fighting Fifth – 5th (Northumberland Fusiliers) Regiment of Foot later Royal Northumberland Fusiliers
The Fighting Fifteenth – 15th The King's Hussars
The Fighting Fortieth – 40th (2nd Somersetshire) Regiment of Foot later South Lancashire Regiment 
The Fighting Ninth – 9th Regiment of Foot later The Norfolk Regiment
The First and the Last – 4th/7th Royal Dragoon Guards
First of Track 1st Royal Tank Regiment (humorous from the infantry's history being named xth of Foot)
Fitch's Grenadiers – The Royal Irish Rifles
The Five-and-threepennies – 53rd Foot
The Flamers – 2nd Battalion The Dorsetshire Regiment
The Flying Bricklayers – Royal Engineers
The Fogies – 41st Foot (originally formed from invalids and Chelsea Pensioners, see 1st Invalids)
The Fore & Aft – Gloucestershire Regiment (wore a second badge on the back of their headdress: see Back Numbers)
The Foreign Legion – Welsh Guards
The Forty Twas – 42nd (Royal Highland) Regiment of Foot later Black Watch
The Forty-Tens – 2nd Battalion Prince of Wales's Leinster Regiment (from an incident in India where the men were 'numbering', or calling out their position in the ranks: after they reached 'forty-nine' the next man called out 'forty-ten'.)
The Four-Wheeled Hussars – Royal Horse Artillery
The Fragile and Suffering Highlanders - 1st Battalion Argyle and Sutherland Highlanders, used by other regiments in the Highland Brigade circa 1960/70

G
The Gallant Half-Hundred – 50th Foot
The Gallants – 9th Battalion East Surrey Regiment
The Gallopers – 2nd Life Guards
The Galloping Gunners – Royal Horse Artillery
The Garvies – Connaught Rangers
The Gay Gordons – Gordon Highlanders (from the name of a popular dance)
The Gentleman Dragoons – 17th Lancers
George's – 8th King's Royal Irish Hussars (gained Royal title in reign of King George III)
The Geraniums – 13th Hussars
The German Legion, or The German Mob – 109th Foot (possibly took recruits from the disbanded British German Legion)
The Glasgow Greys – 70th (Surrey) Regiment of Foot later 2nd Battalion East Surrey Regiment 
The Glesca Keelies – 71st (Highland) Regiment of Foot later 1st Battalion Highland Light Infantry (Regiment was mostly recruited in Glasgow ("Glesca"), allegedly from local ruffians ("Keelies").
The Globe Rangers – Royal Marines (from their badge)
The Glorious Glosters – The Gloucestershire Regiment
Lord Adam Gordon's Life Guards – 3rd Hussars
Graham's Perthshire Grey-Breeks – 90th Regiment of Foot (Perthshire Volunteers) (raised by Thomas Graham, Lord Lynedoch)
The Grannies – Grenadier Guards
The Grasshoppers – 95th (Rifle) Regiment of Foot (reference to rifle green colour of uniforms)
The Green Cats – 17th Foot (from their Royal Tiger badge)
The Green Dragoons – 13th Hussars
The Green Gunners – Princess Beatrice's (Isle of Wight) Heavy Regiment, Royal Artillery, whose officers continued to wear the Rifle green uniform of the Isle of Wight Rifles after they were converted from infantry to coast artillery
The Green Horse – 5th (Princess Charlotte of Wales's) Dragoon Guards 
The Green Howards – 19th (1st North Riding of Yorkshire) Regiment of Foot later Green Howards (Alexandra, Princess of Wales's Own Yorkshire Regiment) (So named in 1744, to distinguish them from Howard's Buffs by facing colour of uniform; both regiments had colonels named Howard at the time)
The Green Jackets – 60th (Royal American) Regiment later Kings Royal Rifle Corps and The Rifle Brigade (in the Napoleonic Wars, both were specialised corps of skirmishers, armed with rifles and wearing rifle green uniforms rather than the standard red coat)
The Green Linnets – 39th (Dorsetshire) Regiment of Foot later The Dorsetshire Regiment
The Green Tigers – see Green Cats
The Greybreeks – see Earl of Mar's, and Graham's
The Grey Dragoons – 2nd Dragoons (Royal Scots Greys)
The Grey Lancers – 21st Lancers (Empress of India's) (from French-grey colour of regimental facings)
The Grey Mafia – Queen Alexandra's Royal Army Nursing Corps
The Guards of the Line – 29th Foot
Guise's Geese – Royal Warwickshire Regiment 
The Gurkhas – Royal Gurkha Rifles

H
The Halls and Balls Light Infantry – 6th Battalion, London Regiment (City of London Rifles)
The Hampshire Tigers – Royal Hampshire Regiment (from their Royal Tiger badge)
The Hanoverian White Horse – Royal Fusiliers
The Havercakes, or The Havercake Lads – 33rd Regiment of Foot later Duke of Wellington's Regiment (West Riding) – because their recruiting officers walked along with an oatcake on their sword-point
Havelock's Temperance Battalion – 48th Middlesex Rifle Volunteer Corps recruited by the noted Temperance campaigner George Cruikshank
The Heavy Gunners – Royal Garrison Artillery
Hell's Last Issue – the Highland Light Infantry (humorous back-acronym)
The Heroes of Talavera – 47th Foot
The Herts Guards (or Hertfordshire Guards) – Hertfordshire Regiment (1/1st Bn served in 4th (Guards) Brigade in 1914–15) 
The Hindoostan Regiment – 76th Foot
The Holy Boys – 9th Regiment of Foot later The Norfolk Regiment (from their Britannia badge, misidentified as the Virgin Mary)
The Horse Doctors – Royal Army Veterinary Corps
The Horse Marines – 17th Lancers (Duke of Cambridge's Own)
The Housemaids' Pets – Grenadier Guards
Howard's Garbage – Green Howards
Howard's Greens – South Wales Borderers
The Hull Commercials – 10th Battalion East Yorkshire Regiment
The Hull Tradesmen – 11th Battalion East Yorkshire Regiment
The Hull Sportsmen – 12th Battalion East Yorkshire Regiment
The T'Others – 13th Battalion East Yorkshire Regiment

I
The Illustrious Garrison – 13th (Somerset) Light Infantry (from their defence of Jellalabad in 1841–42)
The Immortals – 76th Foot
The Ink Slingers – Royal Army Pay Corps
The Iron Chests – 66th Foot
The Iron Regiment – The Royal Sussex Regiment
The Irish Giants – The Royal Irish Rifles
The Irish Lancers – 5th Royal Irish Lancers
The Isle of Wight Gurkhas – Princess Beatrice's Isle of Wight rifles, 8th Battalion Hampshire Regiment (due to the reputed small stature of its members and similarities in drill and uniform to Gurkha regiments.)
The Isle of Wight Rifles – 9 (Princess Beatrice's) Platoon, C (Duke of Connaught's) Company, 6th/7th Battalion Princess of Wales's Royal Regiment (disbanded 1998) (due to the platoon's continued lineage from Princess Beatrice's Isle of Wight rifles, 8th Hampshire Regiment and their location on the Isle of Wight.)

J
Jacks – Military Police during WWI
The Jaegers – 60th (Royal American) Regiment later Kings Royal Rifle Corps (when first formed, included large numbers of German and German-speaking Swiss Jägers (light infantry))
 The Jellalabad Heroes – 13th (Somerset) Light Infantry (from their defence of Jellalabad in 1841–42)
The Jocks – Scots Guards (In Scotland the common Christian name John is often changed to Jock)
Joeys – Royal Marine Light Infantry
Jollies – Royal Marine Light Infantry
The Judaeans – 38th–42nd Battalions Royal Fusiliers (the battalions formed the Jewish Brigade)

K
The Kaiser's Own – 60th (Royal American) Regiment later Kings Royal Rifle Corps (see The Jaegers)
Kamarha – 79th Highlanders
The Kids, or Kiddies – Scots Guards name given to the Third Regiment of Foot Guards when reaching King William III's Guards camp in 1686
The Kingos – King's Liverpool Regiment later King's Regiment
The King's Men – 78th Highlanders later 2nd Battalion Seaforth Highlanders
The King's Hanoverian White Horse – 8th Foot
Kingsley's Stand – Lancashire Fusiliers
Kirke's Lambs – The Queen's (Royal West Surrey Regiment) (from their Paschal Lamb badge; ironic allusion to their brutal conduct under Percy Kirke's command during the Monmouth Rebellion) 
The Kokky-Olly Birds – The King's Own Scottish Borderers
The Kosbies or Kobs – King's Own Scottish Borderers (from their initials)
The Koylis – The King's Own Yorkshire Light Infantry (from their initials)

L
The Lacedemonians – Duke of Cornwall's Light Infantry
 The Lambs – 102nd Foot
The Lancashire Lads – 47th (Lancashire) Regiment of Foot later 1st Battalion The Loyal North Lancashire Regiment
Lancashire Cavalry – B (Duke of Lancaster's Own Yeomanry) Squadron, Queen's Own Yeomanry
The Leather Hats – 8th (The King's) Regiment of Foot later The King's (Liverpool Regiment)
The Lewisham Gunners – 4th London Brigade, Royal Field Artillery
The Light Bobs – Oxfordshire and Buckinghamshire Light Infantry later The Light Infantry
Lightning Conductors – Cheshire Regiment (a detachment of the 2nd Battalion was struck by lightning in 1899)
The Lillywhites
 – Leicestershire Regiment
 – East Lancashire Regiment
 – 109th Regiment of Foot later 2nd Battalion Leinster Regiment
The Lillywhite Seventh – 7th Queen's Own Hussars
 The Lilywhites – 13th/18th Royal Hussars (QMO)
 Limmer's Own – 12th Lancers
 The Lincolnshire Poachers – Lincolnshire Regiment (from a traditional folk song)
 Linseed Lancers – Royal Army Medical Corps
 The Lions – The King's Own (Royal Lancaster Regiment) (from their cap badge)
 The Lions of England – Duke of Lancaster's Regiment
 The Liverpool Blues 
 – Liverpool Blues (Regiment), volunteer unit 1745–46
 – 79th Regiment of Foot (Royal Liverpool Volunteers) 1778–84
 The Liverpool Militia – Irish Guards (due historically to large numbers of Liverpudlian Irish in their ranks)
The 9th London and Lancs – 9th Battalion Devonshire Regiment (West Country Kitchener's Army battalion made up to strength with recruits from London and Lancashire)
Lord Cardigan's Bloodhounds – 11th Hussars (Prince Albert's Own) (commanded for several years in the early nineteenth century by James Brudenell, 7th Earl of Cardigan)
Lord Wellingtons Bodyguard – Northumberland Fusiliers
Loyal Lincoln Volunteers – 81st Regiment of Foot (Loyal Lincoln Volunteers) later 2nd Battalion The Loyal North Lancashire Regiment
 The Lumpers – 1st Life Guards
 The Lumps – 2nd Battalion The Royal Inniskilling Fusiliers

M
The Macraes – 1st Battalion Seaforth Highlanders
 The Maple Leaves – 100th (Prince of Wales's Royal Canadian) Regiment of Foot
 The Meanee Boys – 22nd Foot (from the Battle of Miani)
 The Measurers – Royal Engineers
 The Mediterranean Greys – 50th Foot
 The Micks – Irish Guards (the term is not regarded as derogatory by the regiment)
 The Milestones – 1st Foot
 The Minden Boys – 20th Regiment of Foot later Lancashire Fusiliers
 The Models - 2nd Bn Grenadier Guards
 Monkeys - Royal Military Police
 The Moonrakers – The Wiltshire Regiment (from an old story about Wiltshiremen trying to rescue the reflection of the moon, thinking it had fallen in the village pond)
The Mounted Micks – 4th Royal Irish Dragoon Guards (mildly derogatory name for Irishmen)
 The Mudlarks – Royal Engineers
 Murray's Bucks – 46th (South Devonshire) Regiment of Foot
 The Mutton Lancers – Queen's (Royal West Surrey) Regiment (from their Paschal Lamb and Flag badge)

N
The Namurs – Royal Irish Regiment (from their battle honour of 'Namur' gained in 1695, the first such honour granted to a regiment of the British Army)
The Nanny Goats – The Royal Welsh Fusiliers 
 The Night-Jars – 10th Battalion Manchester Regiment (after the nocturnal bird, for its success in night attacks during 1918)
 Nobody's Own – 20th Hussars (for a time, were almost the only British cavalry regiment not to have a prestigious honorary colonel with his or her title in the regimental name)
 The Norfolk Howards – The Norfolk Regiment
 The Nottingham Hosiers – 45th (Nottinghamshire) (Sherwood Foresters) Regiment of Foot – (lace-making was a traditional industry in Nottinghamshire)
The Notts and Jocks – Sherwood Foresters (from their previous title, The Nottinghamshire and Derbyshire Regiment)
The Nulli Secundus Club – The Coldstream Guards (from their motto: Nullis Secundus (Second to None))
 The Nut-Crackers – The Buffs

O
The Old Agamemnons – 69th (South Lincolnshire) Regiment of Foot later The Welsh Regiment
 The Old Bendovers – see Bendovers
 The Old Black Cuffs – 50th Foot – (from their black facings)
 The Old and Bold
 – Northumberland Fusiliers
 – West Yorkshire Regiment
 – Worcestershire Regiment
 The Old Braggs – 28th Foot
 The Old Bucks – Bedfordshire Regiment (from 1782 to 1809, were the senior regiment raised in Buckinghamshire)
 The Old Buffs – The Buffs (East Kent Regiment) 
The Old Canaries – 11th Hussars (Prince Albert's Own) 
The Old County Regiment – 1st Royal Lancashire Militia (The Duke of Lancaster's Own) after a second regiment was raised in 1798
The Old Dozen – 12th (The East Suffolk) Regiment of Foot later The Suffolk Regiment
Old Eyes – Grenadier Guards
The Old Farmers – 5th (Princess Charlotte of Wales's) Dragoon Guards later 5th Royal Inniskilling Dragoon Guards 
 The Old Firms – 36th Foot
Old Five and Threepences – 53rd (Shropshire) Regiment of Foot later 1st Battalion Shropshire Light Infantry
The Old Fogs – 87th (Royal Irish Fusiliers) Regiment of Foot later 1st Battalion Royal Irish Fusiliers
 The Old Hundredth – 100th (Prince of Wales's Royal Canadian) Regiment of Foot later 1st Battalion Leinster Regiment
The Old Iniskillings – Carabiniers (6th Dragoon Guards) 
The Old Immortals – 76th Regiment of Foot later 2nd Battalion Duke of Wellington's Regiment
The Old Namurers – see The Namurs
 Old Oil Rags – 2nd Dragoons
The Old Seven and Sixpennies – 76th Regiment of Foot
The Old Sixteen – Bedfordshire Regiment 
The Old Stubborns – 45th (Nottinghamshire) Regiment of Foot later 1st Battalion The Sherwood Foresters
 Old Saucy Seventh – 7th Hussars 
 Old Straws – 7th Hussars
 Old Stubborns – 45th Foot
The Old Toughs – The Royal Dublin Fusiliers
The Orange Lilies – 35th (Royal Sussex) Regiment of Foot later 1st Battalion Royal Sussex Regiment
The Oxford Blues – Household Cavalry – (raised by Aubrey de Vere, 20th Earl of Oxford and uniformed in dark blue, the colour later adopted by Oxford University)

P
 Paget's Irregular Horse – 4th Hussars
Paddy's Blackguards – Royal Irish Regiment
The Paras – The Parachute Regiment
 The Paschal Lambs – see Kirke's Lambs
 The Patent Safeties – Life Guards
 The Peacemakers – Bedfordshire Regiment (The regiment had no battle honours until 1882, when it was belatedly given those for the War of the Spanish Succession 170 years earlier; the regimental motto was misquoted as 'Thou Shalt not Kill')
 The People's Cav Royal Tank Regiment
 Perthshire Grey Breeks – 2nd Battalion The Cameronians (Scottish Rifles)
 The Piccadilly Allsorts – London Scottish
 The Piccadilly Butchers – Life Guards
 The Piccadilly Heroes – Paget's Horse (Recruited from London gentlemen's clubs; the 'PH' letters on their helmet flash also gave rise to the alternatives of 'Public House', 'Perfectly Harmless' and 'Phat-heads'.) 
 The Piccadilly Peacocks – Westminster Dragoons
 The Pig and Whistle Light Infantry – Highland Light Infantry
 The Pigs – 76th Foot
 The Pills – Royal Army Medical Corps
 The Plymouth Argylls – composite battalion of Royal Marines and Argyll and Sutherland Highlanders formed in Malayan Campaign (Plymouth is one of the Marines' home bases, with Plymouth Argyle FC as its local football team) 
The Poachers – 2nd Battalion, Royal Anglian Regiment and The Lincolnshire Regiment (from the regimental quick march, "The Lincolnshire Poacher")
The Pompadours – 56th (West Essex) Regiment of Foot later 2nd Battalion Essex Regiment later 3rd Battalion Royal Anglian Regiment
Pontius Pilate's Bodyguard – 1st (Royal) Regiment of Foot, later The Royal Scots (they were the oldest regiment in the British Army and humorously claimed to date back to the time of Christ; in fact they were founded in 1633)
The Poona Guards – East Yorkshire Regiment
The Poona Pets – 109th Regiment of Foot (Bombay Infantry) later 2nd Battalion Leinster Regiment
The Pot Hooks – 77th (East Middlesex) Regiment of Foot later 2nd Battalion Middlesex Regiment
The Potters – 5th Battalion North Staffordshire Regiment recruited from The Potteries area around Stoke-on-Trent
 The Poultice Wallopers – Royal Army Medical Corps
 The Prince of Orange's Own Regiment – 35th Foot
 The Printers – 2nd City of London Rifle Volunteers (unit recruited in Fleet Street from the printing works of Eyre & Spottiswoode and Associated Newspapers)
 The Pull-Throughs – 42nd (East Lancashire) Division (from their divisional number and generally small stature, like the 'Four-by-Two' inches of the flannel pull-through used to clean a rifle).
The Pump and Tortoise - 38th (1st Staffordshire) Regiment of Foot later 1st Battalion South Staffordshire Regiment (from the regimental badge, a stylised fighting castle atop an equally stylised elephant)

Q
Queen's Last Resort – Queen's Lancashire Regiment (humorous back-acronym)
Queer Objects On Horseback – Queen's Own Oxfordshire Hussars (humorous back-acronym)
Queers On Horseback – Queen's Own Hussars (humorous back-acronym)
 Quick Let's Run – Queen's Lancashire Regiment (humorous back-acronym)
 The Quill Drivers – Royal Army Pay Corps
 Quick And Ready And Never Caught - Queen Alexanders Royal Army Nursing Corps

R
Radio Cabs and Taxis – Royal Corps of Transport
The Rag and Oil Company – Royal Army Ordnance Corps (humorous back-acronym)
The Ragged Brigade – 13th Hussars
The Ramnuggar Boys – 14th King's Hussars (from the Battle of Ramnagar in 1849)
Rats After Mouldy Cheese – Royal Army Medical Corps (humorous back-acronym)
 The Ready Reckoners – Highland Regiments
 Really Large Corps – Royal Logistic Corps (humorous back-acronym)
 Reckless Chaps in Trucks – Royal Corps of Transport (humorous back-acronym)
 The Redbreasts – 5th Royal Irish Lancers
 The Redcaps – Royal Military Police (from their distinctive headgear)
 The Red Devils – The Parachute Regiment (Refers to either the use of Tunisian Red mud as camouflage or the red berets worn)
The Red Feathers – 46th (South Devonshire) Regiment of Foot later 2nd Battalion Duke of Cornwall's Light Infantry
Red Knights – 22nd (Cheshire) Regiment of Foot later Cheshire Regiment
 The Red Lancers – 16th Lancers (The only lancer regiment to retain the short-lived red uniform ordered by King William IV in 1830, the others having reverted to blue in 1846)
 The Regiment – Special Air Service (Refers to their successes in the field, a sarcastic belief that saying their name will summon them.)
 The Ribs - 3rd Bn Grenadier Guards. They were the first Infantry to officially serve on board navy ships as Marines
 The Right of the Line – Royal Horse Artillery (from their privileged position on ceremonial parade)
 Rob All My Comrades – Royal Army Medical Corps (derogatory back-acronym from the belief that medical personnel took advantage of their position to steal from casualties)
Rob All Our Comrades – Royal Army Ordnance Corps
The Rollickers – 89th (The Princess Victoria's) Regiment of Foot later 2nd Battalion Royal Irish Fusiliers
The Romulans – Royal Mercian and Lancastrian Yeomanry (RMLY)
The Rorys – The Argyll and Sutherland Highlanders
Rough Engineering Made Easy -Royal Electrical and Mechanical Engineers
The Royal Goats – The Royal Welsh Fusiliers 
The Royal Tigers – York and Lancaster Regiment
Run Away, Someone's Coming – Royal Army Service Corps (humorous back-acronym)
Rusty Buckles – 2nd Dragoon Guards (Queen's Bays)
Rickshaw Cabs and Taxi's - Royal Corps of Transport

S
The Sandbags – Grenadier Guards
The Scarlet Lancers – 16th The Queen's Lancers later 16th/5th The Queen's Royal Lancers – the only British lancer regiment to wear red rather than blue uniforms from 1830 to World War I
 The Sanguinary Sweeps – King's Royal Rifle Corps (from the red facings on their Rifle green (almost black) uniform)
The Saucy Greens – Worcestershire Regiment (from the duck green facing colour of their uniform)
 The Saucy Pompeys – 56th Foot
 Saucy Sixth – 6th Regiment of Foot later Royal Warwickshire Regiment
 Saucy Seventh – 7th Queen's Own Hussars
 Sauvages d'Ecosse – Black Watch
 Scaly Backs - Royal Signals
 The Shiners – Northumberland Fusiliers – from their high standard of spit and polish
The Shiny Fourth – 4th London Brigade, Royal Field Artillery
The Shiny Seventh – 7th (City of London) Battalion, London Regiment – being the only red-coated and brass-buttoned battalion in a brigade otherwise uniformed in rifle green with black buttons
The Shiny Tenth – 10th Royal Hussars
The Shropshire Gunners – 181st Field Regiment, Royal Artillery – on conversion from a battalion of the King's Shropshire Light Infantry, there was a shortage of RA insignia, so the men were ordered to cut the 'KING'S' and 'L.I.' from their shoulder titles, leaving the word 'Shropshire' 
The Skilljngers – Carabiniers (6th Dragoon Guards) 
The Skins
 – 6th (Inniskilling) Dragoons
 – Royal Inniskilling Fusiliers
 Skull and Crossbones – 17th Lancers (see Death and Glory Boys)
 The Sleepy Queens – Queen's Royal Regiment (West Surrey)
Slop Jockeys = The Army Catering Corps
The Snappers – East Yorkshire Regiment
The Splashers – The Wiltshire Regiment
 The Sprats – 94th Foot
 The Springers
 – 62nd (Wiltshire) Regiment of Foot
 – The Wiltshire Regiment
 – The Lincolnshire Regiment
The Staffordshire Knot – 80th Regiment of Foot (Staffordshire Volunteers) later 2nd Battalion South Staffordshire Regiment 
The Star of the Line – Worcestershire Regiment (from the elongated star forming part of the regimental badge)
The Steelbacks
 - 57th (West Middlesex) Regiment of Foot later 1st Battalion Middlesex Regiment
 – The Northamptonshire Regiment
The Steel Heads – 109th Regiment of Foot (Bombay Infantry) later 2nd Battalion Leinster Regiment
The Stickies – The Royal Ulster Rifles (83rd & 86th)
 Stink – Special Brigade, Royal Engineers (responsible for poison gas and flame attacks)
 Stonewallers – 37th Foot
 The Stoney Lane Boys – 3rd South Midland Brigade, Royal Field Artillery (from their headquarters at Stoney Lane, Balsall Heath)
 Strada Reale Highlanders – Gordon Highlanders
 Strawboots
 – 7th Dragoon Guards
 – 7th Hussars
 The Sugar Stick Brigade – Royal Army Ordnance Corps
The Supple Twelfth – 12th Royal Lancers
The Surprisers – 46th (South Devonshire) Regiment of Foot
 The Sussex Sappers – 1st Sussex Engineers
The Sweeps – 95th Rifles later The Rifle Brigade (from their black facings)

T
The Tabs – 15th The King's Hussars later 15th/19th The King's Royal Hussars
 1st Tangerines – 2nd Foot (originally raised for the garrison of Tangiers)
 The Tankies – Royal Tank Regiment specifically, rather than cavalry units equipped with tanks – this differentiates from "tankers" as the US army term for all tank soldiers
 The Tartan Tankies 4th Royal Tank Regiment
 The Tearaways – 49th Foot
 Teenie Weenie Airlines - Army Air Corps
 THEM – Special Air Service - relates to the hush-hush nature of most of their work, where it wouldn't be prudent to mention their name, coined by Auld Sapper.
 The Thin Red Line – 93rd (Sutherland Highlanders) Regiment of Foot later The Argyll and Sutherland Highlanders
 The Three Quarter Lancers - 9th/12th Royal Lancers (humourous simplification of regimental title)
 The Three Tens – 30th Foot later East Lancashire Regiment
 The Tigers – 67th (South Hampshire) Regiment of Foot who amalgamated with 37th (North Hampshire) Regiment of Foot to form the Hampshire Regiment in 1881 and now Princess of Wales's Royal Regiment (after the Royal Tiger badge awarded to the 67th in honour of 21 years continuous service in India)
The Tin Bellies – 1st Life Guards and 2nd Life Guards 
Titchburns Own – Carabiniers (6th Dragoon Guards)
The T'Others – 13th Battalion East Yorkshire Regiment 
 The Tow Rows – Grenadier Guards
The Trades Union – 1st King's Dragoon Guards
The Trifles - the Rifles
The Triple Xs – 30th Regiment of Foot later East Lancashire Regiment
The Twin Roses – York and Lancaster Regiment
The Two Fours – 44th (East Essex) Regiment of Foot later 1st Battalion Essex Regiment
The Two Fives – 55th (Westmorland) Regiment of Foot later 2nd Battalion Border Regiment
The Two Tens – 20th Regiment of Foot later Lancashire Fusiliers
The Two Twos – 22nd (Cheshire) Regiment of Foot
 THOSE – Special Boat Service - for same reasons as per THEM above. As in, being one of THEM or one of THOSE.

U
The Ups and Downs – 69th (South Lincolnshire) Regiment of Foot later The Welsh Regiment – because the number 69 reads the same either way up

V
The Vein Openers – 29th (Worcestershire) Regiment of Foot later Worcestershire Regiment (refers to involvement of the 29th in the Boston Massacre)
 The Vikings – 1st Battalion Royal Anglian Regiment
 Virgin Mary's Guard – 7th Dragoon Guards
 The Vulgar Fractions – 16/5th Lancers

W
Wardour's Horse – The Welsh Regiment
The Warwickshire Lads – Royal Warwickshire Regiment
 Wellington's Body Guard – 5th Foot
Wenlock's Horse – East Riding of Yorkshire Yeomanry (after the unit's first commanding officer, Beilby Lawley, 3rd Baron Wenlock)
 The Whisky Blenders – 34th Foot
 The White Stars – 7th Hussars
 The Whitewashers – 61st Foot
 The Wild Indians – 100th (Prince of Wales's Royal Canadian) Regiment of Foot
 Wolfe's Own – 47th (Lancashire) Regiment of Foot later 1st Battalion The Loyal North Lancashire Regiment
The Wonkey Donkeys – Berkshire Yeomanry
The Woofers – Worcestershire and Sherwood Foresters Regiment (pronunciation of WFR)
 Wright's Irregulars – 582nd Moonlight Battery, Royal Artillery (after the unit's commanding officer)

X
The XV – 20th Hussars

Y
 The Young Bucks – 85th Foot
 The Young Buffs – 31st (Huntingdonshire) Regiment of Foot later 1st Battalion East Surrey Regiment (to distinguish them from the Old Buffs (3rd Foot) who also wore buff facings)
 Young Eyes – 7th Hussars
 Young and Livelies – York and Lancaster Regiment

See also

 Lists of nicknames – nickname list articles on Wikipedia
 Nicknames of U.S. Army divisions
 Regimental nicknames of the Canadian Forces

Notes

References

 Anon, Lewisham Gunners: A Centenary History of 291st (4th London) Field Regiment R.A. (T.A.) formerly 2nd Kent R.G.A. (Volunteers), Chatham: W & J Mackay, 1962.
 Maj R. Money Barnes, Military Uniforms of Britain and the Empire, London: Seeley Service, 1960/Sphere 1972.
 Maj R. Money Barnes, The Uniforms and History of the Scottish Regiments, London: Seeley Service, 1956/Sphere 1972.
 Ian F.W. Beckett, Riflemen Form: A study of the Rifle Volunteer Movement 1859–1908, Aldershot: Ogilby Trusts, 1982, .
 
 Rev E. Cobham Brewer, Brewer's Dictionary of Phrase and Fable, 1870 (and many subsequent editions).
 Kate Caffrey, Farewell Leicester Square: The Old Contemptibles, 12 August–20 November 1914, London: Andre Deutsch, 1980.
 
 
 Frederick E. Gibbon, The 42nd East Lancashire Division 1914–1918, London: Country LIfe, 1920/Uckfield: Naval & Military Press, 2003, .
 Neill Gilhooley, A History of the 9th (Highlanders) Royal Scots, the Dandy Ninth, Barnsley: Pen & Sword, 2019, .
 Capt E.G. Godfrey, The "Cast Iron Sixth": A History of the Sixth Battalion London Regiment (The City of London Rifles), London: Old Comrades' Association, 1935//Uckfield: Naval & Military Press, 2002, .
 
 Richard Holmes, Soldiers: Army Lives and Loyalties from Redcoats to Dusty Warriors, London: HarperPress, 2011, .
 Brig E.A. James, British Regiments 1914–18, London: Samson Books, 1978/Uckfield: Naval & Military Press, 2001, .
 N.B. Leslie, The Battle Honours of the British and Indian Armies 1695–1914, London: Leo Cooper, 1970.
 Norman E.H. Litchfield, The Territorial Artillery 1908–1988 (Their Lineage, Uniforms and Badges), Nottingham: Sherwood Press, 1992, ISBN 0-9508205-2-0.
 Martin Middlebrook, The First Day on the Somme, London: Allen Lane 1971/Fontana 1975.
 Martin Middlebrook, The Kaiser's Battle, 21 March 1918: The First Day of the German Spring Offensive, London: Allen Lane, 1978/Penguin, 1983, .
 Col L.F. Morling, Sussex Sappers: A History of the Sussex Volunteer and Territorial Army Royal Engineer Units from 1890 to 1967, Seaford: 208th Field Co, RE/Christians–W.J. Offord, 1972.
 Don Neal, Guns and Bugles: The Story of the 6th Bn KSLI – 181st Field Regiment RA 1940–1946, Studley: Brewin, 2001, .
 Andrew Rawson, Battleground Europe: Loos –1915: Hohenzollern Redoubt, Barnsley: Leo Cooper, 2003, .
 Donald Richter, Chemical Soldiers: British Gas Warfare in World War I, Lawrence, Kansas: University of Kansas Press, 1992, .
 Tpr Cosmo Rose-Innes, With Paget's Horse to the Front, London: John McQueen, 1901/Leopold Classic Library, 2015, ASIN: B019SZWY6K.
 Col Peter Walton, Simkin's Soldiers: The British Army in 1890, Vol I: The Cavalry and The Royal Artillery, Victorian Military Society Special Publication No 5, Dorking, Surrey: Victorian Military Society, 1981, .
 Ray Westlake, Tracing the Rifle Volunteers, Barnsley: Pen and Sword, 2010, .
 Maj R.J.T. Williamson & Col J. Lawson Whalley, History of the Old County Regiment of Lancashire Militia, London: Simpkin, Marshall, 1888.

External sources
 Chris Baker, The Long, Long Trail

Regiments of the British Army
British Army regiments
Nicknames of British Army regiments
Nic